Puchau may refer to:
 Púchov, Slovakia
 Püchau, a division of Machern, Saxony